Microkayla is a genus of frogs in the family Strabomantidae.

Species
The following species are recognised in the genus Microkayla:

References

Amphibians of South America
Amphibian genera